Justin Moss (born June 19, 1993) is an American professional basketball player who currently plays for the Brownstown Bears of the Maximum Basketball League. He played college basketball with the Buffalo Bulls.

Collegiate career 
Moss committed to Toledo out of high school but was sidelined before his freshman year after being diagnosed with hypertrophic cardiomyopathy, a heart condition thought to be career-ending. Despite having an implantable cardioverter-defibrillator implanted into his chest, Toledo refused to clear Moss to play but offered to allow him to remain at the school on an athletic scholarship.

As a result, Moss transferred to Indian Hills Community College in Iowa where he played one season before joining his former high school coach Nate Oats at Buffalo for his sophomore season. As a junior in 2015, he was named Mid-American Conference Player of the Year and an Associated Press Honorable Mention All-American. Moss received the MAC East Player of the Week award twice that season, once for a week which included a double-double against the top-ranked Kentucky Wildcats. At the conclusion of the spring semester, UB Athletics recognized Moss as the most valuable men's basketball player of the season during the Blue and White Awards Show on ESPN3.

In June 2015, shortly after earning Conference Player of the Year honors, Moss and two of his teammates were discovered to have stolen $650 from Buffalo football players. On August 24, 2015, he was dismissed from the University at Buffalo.

Professional career 
Moss signed with the Orangeville A's after leaving school. Moss was named the league's Player of the Week for the week ending April 3, 2016. He finished the season ranked third in the league in rebounds and fourth in points.

In June 2016, he was invited along with six other players to try out for the Philadelphia 76ers prior to the 2016 NBA Draft.

After the Orangeville franchise folded, Moss played five games for a team in Panama. In July 2017, he signed a contract to play for Aubenas in the third-tier French Nationale Masculine 1 league.

In 2021, Moss joined Soles de Mexicali of the Mexican Liga Nacional de Baloncesto Profesional. He averaged 9.0 points, 4.7 rebounds, and 1.0 assists per game. On October 21, Moss signed with Zakho SC of the Iraqi Basketball League. On November 12, he signed with the Brownstown Bears of the Maximum Basketball League.

References 

1993 births
Living people
American expatriate basketball people in Canada
American expatriate basketball people in France
American expatriate basketball people in Iraq
American expatriate basketball people in Mexico
Basketball players from Michigan
Buffalo Bulls men's basketball players
Indian Hills Warriors basketball players
People from Romulus, Michigan
Power forwards (basketball)
Small forwards
American men's basketball players
Soles de Mexicali players
Romulus Senior High School alumni